The New Zealand Society of Industrial Designers, known as NZSID, formed in 1959, was a professional body for designers in New Zealand. Its membership was multi-disciplinary, representing designers in all branches of design for industry—interior, product, furniture, graphic, packaging, exhibition, apparel, design education, design management... It was rebranded New Zealand Society of Designers (NZSD) and reconstituted on 28 May 1988 with a full-time office, the Designers Secretariat, from 1 August, and The Best New Zealand Graphic Design Awards scheme from 1 October.

The Society merged with the New Zealand Association of Interior Designers (NZAID) to form a new society, the Designers Institute of New Zealand (DINZ), in April 1991, which was incorporated on 23 August 1991. NZSID and NZAID were formally dissolved as incorporated societies on 11 August and 10 October 2000 respectively.

References

External links
Designers Institute of New Zealand

Design institutions
New Zealand design
Learned societies of New Zealand
Organizations established in 1959
Arts organizations established in 1959